Moustafa Ismail (born 1988) is an Egyptian bodybuilder, who once held the Guinness World Records for the largest upper arm circumference in the world. This has been attributed to his extensive synthol use. The Guinness World Records now states that it has taken the decision to no longer accept claims for largest upper arm circumference on the grounds that there are too many evidentiary variables to ensure a declarative benchmark that is firmly beyond dispute.

References 

1988 births
Living people
World record holders
Egyptian bodybuilders
Place of birth missing (living people)